Kavana (born Anthony Kavanagh, 4 November 1977) is an English singer and actor who scored a number of hit singles in the late 90s also winning Smash Hits ‘Best male artist’ His second album ‘Instinct’ went platinum in Asia followed by a tour of Australia and Japan. Kavana moved to Los Angeles in 2001 where he appeared in cult MTV soap opera ‘Undressed’ In 2014, he became part of the supergroup 5th Story, who took part in the second series of The Big Reunion followed by a major arena tour in the U.K.In 2015, he took part in the fifteenth series of the Channel 5 reality series Celebrity Big Brother making the final week.

Career
He released two albums Kavana (1997) and Instinct (1999) and enjoyed a number of chart singles including "I Can Make You Feel Good" (his debut UK Top 10 hit, reaching #8), "MFEO" (another No.8 hit) and "Will You Wait for Me?". Other songs included "Crazy Chance", "Thank You" and "Special Kind of Something".
He resided in Los Angeles, California for several years where he appeared in commercials, the MTV series Undressed, and had a publishing deal as a songwriter. In 2005, he appeared in the music video for Today , by his friend Melanie Brown, before returning to the United Kingdom.

In 2006, Kavana played a recurring role in a number of episodes of E4's Hollyoaks: In the City. He also began working with Jools Holland as a session musician and backing vocalist. He appeared as a contestant on Grease Is the Word in April 2007 and got put through to 'boot camp', where he was paired with Alison Crawford. Although Crawford was eliminated, Kavana booked a place in the final of the competition, where he was declared runner-up on 9 June 2007.

In 2008, he appeared in the theatre production The Extra Factor, a fictional on-stage musical based on the X Factor.

In 2011 he toured with G*Mania, a musical show inspired by the TV series Glee. The cast then recorded a Christmas single, a cover of "Don't Stop Believin'" by Journey. Kavana appeared in the music video for the song.

He appeared on the 2013 series of BBC Saturday night singing show The Voice UK where he failed to progress past the audition stage.

In December 2013, it was announced that Kavana, Dane Bowers, Gareth Gates, Kenzie and Adam Rickitt would join together to form a supergroup called 5th Story for series 2 of The Big Reunion.

In January 2015, he took part in the Channel 5 reality series Celebrity Big Brother where he came 7th. Later that year he released a new single "Deja Vu"—his first for many years.

Personal life
In February 2014, Kavana came out publicly as being gay and said his biggest regret was never telling his parents.

Discography

Albums

Singles

Filmography

References

1977 births
Living people
English gay actors
Singers from Manchester
People from Moston, Manchester
English people of Indian descent
British expatriates in the United States
The Voice UK contestants
English gay musicians
21st-century English male singers
21st-century English singers
5th Story members
British LGBT singers
20th-century LGBT people
21st-century LGBT people